Rutilicus can refer (confusingly) to the traditional names for two different stars:

 Beta Herculis
 Zeta Herculis